Concarán is the capital city of Chacabuco Department or County, in San Luis Province in central Argentina.

•Distances:

Merlo: 28 mi/45 km.

Buenos Aires: 488 mi/786 km.

Córdoba: 163 mi/263 km.

San Luis: 99 mi/160 km.

Mendoza: 258 mi/415 km.

Santiago: 479 mi/772 km.

Education 
Concarán City has two kindergartens, two primary schools, and two secondary schools.

The most important of them is the secondary school Technical College Governor Elías Adre. It's on the north of the city and it's one of the three best secondary schools in San Luis Province.

References 

Populated places in San Luis Province